The Museo Poldi Pezzoli is an art museum in Milan, Italy. It is located near the Teatro alla Scala, on Via Manzoni 12.
 
The museum was originated in the 19th century as a private collection of Gian Giacomo Poldi Pezzoli (1822–1879) and his mother, Rosa Trivulzio, of the family of the condottiero Gian Giacomo Trivulzio. Many of the rooms in the palace were redecorated starting in 1846, a commissions entrusted to Luigi Scrosati and Giuseppe Bertini. Individual rooms were often decorated and furnished to match the paintings hung on the walls. The architect Simone Cantoni (1736–1818) rebuilt the palazzo in its present Neoclassical style with an English-style interior garden. In 1850–1853, Poldi Pezzoli commissioned the architect Giuseppe Balzaretto to refurbish his apartment.

Pezzoli in his testament left the house and contents to the Brera Academy. Giuseppe Bertini, director of the Academy, opened the museum on 25 April 1881. During World War II, the palazzo suffered severe damage, but the artworks had been placed in safe storage. The museum was reopened in 1951 after reconstruction.

The museum is notable for its broad collection of Northern Italian and Netherlandish/Flemish artists. The exhibition includes weaponry, glassworks, ceramics, jewelry, and furnishings.

Collection: Italian painters
Works on display include Italian painters such as:

Northern European painters
Painters in the collection include: Breughel the younger; Cranach; Goltzius; James Baker Pyne; Thomas Shotter Boys; Sutterman; Teniers the younger;  Jacob Toorenvliet; Pierre Tetar van Elven; Mathijs Van Hellemont; Jan Van der Meer II; Willem Van Mieris; Jacob Ferdinand Voet; Nicolaus Alexander Mair Von Landshut, (Mair Landshut); and Cornelis de Wael.

Examples of the collection

References

External links 

Virtual tour of the Museo Poldi Pezzoli provided by Google Arts & Culture

Art museums and galleries in Milan
Tourist attractions in Milan